The St Nicholas Naval Cathedral is a Russian Orthodox cathedral church located in Karosta in the north of Liepāja, Latvia.

Construction
The cathedral was built on the style of 17th century traditional Russian churches with a central dome representing Christ with 4 smaller domes representing the four evangelists on designs made by Vasily Kosyakov. It was built to serve as the cathedral church of the Russian navy stationed in Karosta. The cornerstone was laid in the presence of a number of dignitaries including Tsar Nicholas II of Russia. The cathedral was completed two years later in 1903 and was formally consecrated and dedicated to the patron saint of seafarers in the presence of the Tsar himself.

WWI
The cathedral's belongings, including bells and icons, were transported to Russia during the outbreak of WWI, for safe keeping. The rest of the items were stolen by the Germans who invaded Latvia. After independence in 1918, the church was converted into a Lutheran church to serve the Latvian navy personnel.

Soviet Occupation
The cathedral continued to function as place of worship until the Soviet re-occupation of Latvia in 1944. The Soviets prohibited anyone entering the Karosta area which was turned into a secret Soviet navy territory. Consequently, the cathedral was converted into a gymnasium, a cinema and a recreation and entertainment room, referred to as the 'red corner' for the needs of sailors and soldiers. The interior of the central dome was closed to eliminate the Acoustics which made it difficult for navy personnel to hear movies in the cinema.

Independence
After Latvia's independence from the Soviet Union in 1991, the cathedral was given back to the Latvian Orthodox Church under the authority of the Russian Orthodox Church with the first service taking place that same year in December.

Mosaics and Paintings
The mosaics were designed by V. Frolov, while the wood carvings and gilding of the iconostas were made by P. Abosimov. The paintings of the central and the right-side altar spheres were made by F. Railyan and the frescoes of the left-side altar spheres were painted by M. Vasilyev.

References

External links

Cathedrals in Latvia
Eastern Orthodox churches in Latvia
Churches completed in 1903
20th-century Eastern Orthodox church buildings
Church buildings with domes
Buildings and structures in Liepāja
20th-century churches in Latvia